Karingal Hub Shopping Centre and Star Zone Karingal are each part of a regional shopping centre complex, located at 330 Cranbourne Rd, Frankston, Victoria in Australia, approximately  south of Melbourne CBD. It has the only BIG W on the peninsula and has a variety of shops.

History & Developments

 Karingal Hub was opened in 1978 and has had many incremental expansions over time.
 In 2005 the centre's entertainment and well being section was opened and named Star Zone Karingal.
 In 2006, redevelopment of the shopping centre included refurbishment of the inner and outer facades and additional retail stores inside.
 Karingal Hub has an ongoing renovation and extension in early 2020 and will end around the end of 2021. The Development will include a new marketplace, Coles, Aldi, Outside spaces and refurbished Woolworths.

Tenants 
Karingal Hub has a wide variety of supermarkets, discount department stores and specialty stores.

Major retailers include:

 Coles
 Woolworths
 Big W
 Aldi
 Village Cinemas
 TK Maxx
 Best & Less
 The Reject Shop

References

External links
Karingal Hub Shopping Centre & Star Zone Karingal

Shopping centres in Melbourne
Shopping malls established in 1978
1978 establishments in Australia
Buildings and structures in the City of Frankston